Brachyscome ascendens, the border ranges daisy, is a species of flowering plant in the family Asteraceae and is endemic to Australia. It has mostly mauve daisy-like flowers and a yellow centre.

Description
Brachyscome ascendens is a herbaceous perennial with slender stems rising from the base of the plant or upper leaves. The leaves decrease in size toward the end of the branch, usually with fewer lobes. The uppermost leaves often with smooth margins, lance or narrow shaped. Flowering occurs April, October and December.

Taxonomy and naming
 Brachyscome ascendens was first formally described in 1948 by Gwenda Davis and the description was published in Proceedings of the Linnean Society of New South Wales. The specific epithet ascendens is derived from the Latin word ascendo meaning "mount", "climb", "rise" or "grow".

Distribution and habitat
Border ranges daisy grows in forests or woodland on rocky basalt slopes from the McPherson Range area and to the east near the New South Wales and Queensland  border.

Conservation status
Brachyscome ascendens is classified as endangered in New South Wales.

References

ascendens
Flora of New South Wales
Plants described in 1948